Janice Clare Reid  (born 19 September 1947) is an Australian academic and medical anthropologist, who has specialised in Aboriginal and refugee health. She was Vice-Chancellor of the University of Western Sydney from 1998 to 2013.

Early life and education
Reid was born in Brighton, South Australia on 19 September 1947. She was educated at the Presbyterian Girls College (now Seymour College) and then completed a BSc at the University of Adelaide. She later completed an MA and PhD at Stanford University, USA.

Career

Reid began her career as research assistant (1966–1968) at the Australian Mineral Development Laboratories in Adelaide and tutor (1968) in the Department of Geology at her alma mater, the University of Adelaide. In 1968–1969 she worked as a high school teacher in Papua New Guinea. She spent 1971 and 1972 in the USA at Stanford University as teaching assistant and graduate research assistant, while gaining her PhD. Returning to Australian in 1974 Reid worked first as research officer in the Department of Community Medicine at the University of New South Wales and later as program coordinator at the same university.

In 1978 she moved to the University of Sydney, as lecturer in the Department of Behavioural and Genetic Studies. A year later she was promoted within the university to Associate Professor and Senior Lecturer School of Public Health and Tropical Medicine. In 1987 Reid was appointed Foundation Head of the School of Community Health, at University of Sydney.

While Pro Vice-Chancellor (Academic) at the University of Queensland (1992–1996) Reid was member of a number of National Health and Medical Research Council (NHMRC) Standing Committees.

On her retirement from the position of Vice-Chancellor of the University of Western Sydney in December 2013, Reid was made an Emeritus Professor in recognition of her distinguished service to the University, with its 40,000 students and more than 3000 staff.

From April 2015 to December 2016 Reid was a member of the Code of Review Committee, which was appointed to provide expert advice on revisions to the Australian Code for the Responsible Conduct of Research (2007), a document co-written by NHMRC, the Australian Research Council (ARC) and Universities Australia (UA) and produce a draft Guide on investigating and managing potential breaches of the Code.

In 2017 Reid and Dr Rhonda Hawkins AM conducted a review of the University Council of Macquarie University and made a number of recommendations to improve its efficiency, including introducing fixed terms and term limits and reducing the size of the Council.

Awards and recognition

 Awarded the 1984 Wellcome Medal for Research in Anthropology as Applied to Medical Problems by the Royal Anthropological Institute of Great Britain and Ireland
 Appointed Fellow of the Academy of the Social Sciences in Australia, 1991
 Appointed Member of the Order of Australia (AM) in the 1998 Australia Day Honours "for service to crosscultural public health research and the development of health services of socio-economically disadvantaged groups in the community".
 Granted Centenary Medal, 1 January 2001 "for service to Australian society through health and university administration".
 Awarded Doctor of Letters, honoris causa, 2013 by the University of Western Sydney
 Appointed Fellow of the Royal Society of NSW, 2014
 Appointed Companion of the Order of Australia (AC) in the 2015 Australia Day Honours "for eminent service to the tertiary education sector through executive roles, as an advocate for equitable access to educational opportunities, particularly for Indigenous, refugee and lower socio-economic communities, and to health, medical and health care research and cultural bodies."

Bibliography

As author
 Sorcerers and Healing Spirits: Continuity and Change in an Aboriginal Medical System, Australia National University Press, Canberra, 1983,

As editor
 Body, Land and Spirit: Health and Healing in Aboriginal Society, University of Queensland, St Lucia, 1982, 
 The Health of Immigrant Australia, co-edited with Peggy Trompf, Harcourt Brace Jovanovich, Sydney, 1990, 
 The Health of Aboriginal Australia, co-edited with Peggy Trompf, Harcourt Brace Jovanovich, Sydney 1991,

References

External links
 Official website

1947 births
Living people
People from South Australia
Companions of the Order of Australia
University of Adelaide alumni
Fellows of the Academy of the Social Sciences in Australia
Fellows of the Royal Society of New South Wales
National Library of Australia Council members